North East is a constituency of the London Assembly. It was previously represented by Jennette Arnold of the Labour Party, who was directly elected at the 2004 election after holding a London-wide seat since 2000. Arnold stood down in 2021. Following the 2021 London Assembly election, Arnold was succeeded by Sem Moema.

It encompasses the London Boroughs of Hackney, Islington and Waltham Forest.

Assembly members

Mayoral election results 
Below are the results for the candidate which received the highest share of the popular vote in the constituency at each mayoral election.

Assembly election results
Ben Seifret was originally selected as the Conservative Party candidate for the 2021 election, but on 7 September 2019 resigned as a candidate citing his opposition to Brexit. He subsequently joined the Liberal Democrats. He was replaced in February 2020 by Emma Best, a local councillor in Waltham Forest.

2020s

2010s

References

London Assembly constituencies
Politics of the London Borough of Islington
Politics of the London Borough of Hackney
Politics of the London Borough of Waltham Forest
2000 establishments in England
Constituencies established in 2000